= List of ambassadors of Turkey to Botswana =

The list of ambassadors of Turkey to Botswana provides a chronological record of individuals who have served as the diplomatic representatives of the Republic of Turkey to the Republic of Botswana.

== List of ambassadors ==
Ambassador	Term start	Term end	Ref.
İbrahim Mete Yağlı	15 October 2014	15 January 2019	
Meltem Büyükkarakaş	15 January 2019	15 January 2023	
Ahmet İdem Akay	15 January 2023	Present	
